Fifty Big Ones (also spelled 50 Big Ones) is a two-disc compilation album released by Capitol Records consisting of material from the American rock and roll band the Beach Boys. The album was released in 2012 to commemorate the band's 50th anniversary, and features some remastered mixes and stereo debuts. The track listing is similar to the setlist the band played on the 50th anniversary tour.

The name of the compilation is a reference to their 1976 album, 15 Big Ones, which included fifteen songs and commemorated their fifteenth anniversary (two songs from that album, "It's OK" and "Rock and Roll Music", are included here).

In Japan, the disc was released with a 51st track: the single version of "Be True To Your School".

Track listing
All tracks written by Brian Wilson/Mike Love, unless otherwise noted.

Disc one

Disc two

Single disc track listing
That's Why God Made The Radio 3:20	
California Girls 2:47	
Sloop John B 3:00	
Wouldn't It Be Nice 2:33	
Surfer Girl 2:27	
Do It Again (Remastered) 2:18	
Surfin' Safari (Mono/Remastered 2012) 2:06	
Surfin' U.S.A. 2:29	
Don't Worry Baby 2:50	
Little Deuce Coupe 1:40	
I Get Around 2:13	
Fun, Fun, Fun 2:20	
Be True To Your School (Remastered) 2:11	
Dance, Dance, Dance 2:04	
All Summer Long 2:10	
Help Me, Rhonda 2:49	
Rock And Roll Music (Remastered) 2:29	
God Only Knows 2:55	
Good Vibrations 3:37	
Kokomo	3:35

References

2012 greatest hits albums
The Beach Boys compilation albums
Capitol Records compilation albums
EMI Records compilation albums
Compilation albums published posthumously